is a Japanese author. He is a graduate of the law school at Kwansei Gakuin University. He is best known as the creator of the Haruhi Suzumiya series for which he won the grand prize at the eighth annual Sneaker Awards and has been adapted into an anime television series. While Tanigawa was on hiatus from writing his light novel series, he wrote the manga series Amnesia Labyrinth, which was serialized in Dengeki Bunko Magazine.

Career 
Tanigawa was born in Nishinomiya City, Hyōgo Prefecture. He attended Hyōgo Prefectural Nishinomiya Kita High School before attending and graduating from the Kwansei Gakuin University with a degree in law.

After graduating from university, he worked as a manager at a women's clothing store before making his official debut in March 2003 with the novel Dengeki!! Aegis 5 under Dengeki Bunko's Dengeki Moeoh magazine. On June 7 of the same year, the eighth Sneaker award-winning novel The Melancholy of Haruhi Suzumiya and Tanigawa's Escape from The School! were released on the same day. The Haruhi Suzumiya series has sold 8 million copies in Japan and has been sold in 15 countries around the world, with a total of 16.5 million novel and manga copies sold by May 2011.

In 2018, he was a member of the selection committee for the 24th Sneaker Awards.

Personal life 
When he was in high school, Tanigawa attended art club and also showed up at the literature club once a week. In university, he was a member of the painting club.

After graduating from college, he worked at a women's clothing store as a manager, but suddenly felt like quitting and becoming a writer. While receiving unemployment insurance, Tanigawa frequented the library to read as much as possible. Just as his savings were running out and he felt that he was "doomed", he was contacted by the editorial department of Dengeki Bunko, informing him that his novel The Melancholy of Haruhi Suzumiya had just won the grand prize of the annual Sneaker Awards.

Tanigawa says that his desire to become a writer was triggered by reading various novels from his childhood, and that he gradually developed a "circuit in his mind that he wanted to write." Even after the success of Haruhi Suzumiya, he is not sure whether he is truly a writer or not. In an interview with his editor, Tanigawa was described as a "very quiet and knowledgeable person who uses his 'CPU' and memory to select the knowledge stored in the large hard-disk in his head before outputting in a concise and precise manner."

He was present during the Great Hanshin earthquake. He is a Hanshin Tigers fan. He did not know of the existence of dōjin and eroge until the writing of The Melancholy of Haruhi Suzumiya. He enjoys playing mahjong and likes motorcycles. He uses a thumb-shift keyboard.

Influences 
Tanigawa has said that his work is influenced by the science fiction and young adult novels he read during junior high school. In particular, he cites Hideyuki Kikuchi, Baku Yumemakura, Ellery Queen, S. S. Van Dine, and Isaac Asimov as major influences.

In an interview with screenwriter Dai Satō, he said that he prefers Mamoru Oshii's anime film adaptations of Urusei Yatsura to the original manga, in particular enjoying Urusei Yatsura 2: Beautiful Dreamer.

Works

Light novels

  — 
  — 
  — 
  — 
  — 
  — 
  — 
  — 
  — 
  —  (regular edition),  (limited edition)
  —  (regular edition),  (limited edition)
  — 

 Escape from The School — 
 I-My-Me — 
 The Laughing Bootleg — 
 Final Destination — 
 Not Dead or Not Alive — 
 Vampire Syndrome — 

Dengeki Aegis 5
  — 
  — 

The Closed Universe
  — 

The Guardian of My World
  — 
  — 
  —

Manga
Amnesia Labyrinth
  — 
  —

Collaborations
Bokusatsu Tenshi Dokuro-chan Desu
  —

References

External links

Entry in The Encyclopedia of Science Fiction

Japanese science fiction writers
Light novelists
Living people
People from Hyōgo Prefecture
1970 births
20th-century Japanese novelists
21st-century Japanese novelists
Haruhi Suzumiya
20th-century Japanese male writers